Fluke may refer to:

Biology
 Fluke (fish), a species of marine flatfish
 Fluke (tail), the lobes of the tail of a cetacean, such as dolphins or whales, ichthyosaurs, mosasaurs, plesiosaurs, and  metriorhynchids.
 Fluke (flatworm), parasitic flatworms in the class Trematoda
 Blood fluke
 Liver fluke

Arts and entertainment
 Fluke (album), a 1995 album by Canadian rock band Rusty
 Fluke (band), a British electronic dance music group
 Fluke (film), a 1995 film directed by Carlo Carlei
 Fluke (General Hospital), a character in the American television series General Hospital
 Fluke (novel), a 1977 novel by English horror writer James Herbert
 Fluke, or, I Know Why the Winged Whale Sings, a 2003 novel by Christopher Moore
 Fluke Mini-Comics & Zine Festival, a one-day mini-comics, small press, and 'zine festival held annually in Athens, Georgia

People
 Emily Fluke, American ice hockey player
 Joanne Fluke (born c. 1940), American author
 John Fluke (1911–1984), American engineer, Founder & CEO of Fluke Corporation
 Louise Fluke (1900–1986), designer of the Flag of Oklahoma
 Sandra Fluke  (born 1981), attorney, feminist, LGBTQ activist
 Natouch Siripongthon (born 1996), Thai actor, nicknamed Fluke

Other uses
 Fluke (anchor), blades at the end of an anchor
 Fluke (cue sports), an unintentionally fortuitous shot in cue sports such as snooker
 Fluke Corporation, a manufacturer of electrical and electronic test equipment
 Fluke Ridge, Artistotle Mountains, Graham Land, Antarctica
 Snow fluke, an anchoring device for climbing and camping

See also
 Coincidence
 Flook (disambiguation)
 Fluker (disambiguation)
 One-off (disambiguation)

Animal common name disambiguation pages